Galen Carter Spencer (September 19, 1840 in New York, New York – October 19, 1904 in Greenwich, Connecticut) was an American archer who competed in the 1904 Summer Olympics. He was also a minister of the Methodist Episcopal Church. He won the gold medal in the team competition. In the Double American round he finished thirteenth. He died exactly one month after winning the medal.

References

External links
 
 profile

1840 births
1904 deaths
American male archers
Archers at the 1904 Summer Olympics
Olympic gold medalists for the United States in archery
Medalists at the 1904 Summer Olympics
American Methodist clergy